Tisis thaiana is a moth in the family Lecithoceridae. It was described by Kyu-Tek Park in 2003. It is found in Thailand.

The wingspan is 18-18.5 mm for males and 16-17.5 mm for females. The forewings are dark brown at the base, with the costa slightly convex near one-fourth length, then almost straight. There are two to three golden-yellow transverse streaks before dark-brown fascia. There is a golden-yellow, L-shaped transverse streak arising from two-fifths length of the costa and extending to near the tornus. There is also another golden-yellow streak along the costa beyond the middle, extending to the tornus along the termen. The hindwings are brownish grey on the upper half and dark brown on the lower half.

Etymology
The species name refers to the country of origin.

References

Moths described in 2003
Tisis